Kružlov is a village and municipality in Bardejov District in the Prešov Region of north-east Slovakia. In historical records, the village was first mentioned in 1460. The municipality lies at an altitude of 360 metres and covers an area of 10.143 km².
It has a population of about 1000 people.

References

External links
 

Villages and municipalities in Bardejov District
Šariš